Dizaj Khalil railway station (Persian:ايستگاه راه آهن دیزج خلیل, Istgah-e Rah Ahan-e Dizaj Khalil) is located 1.5 km south of Dizaj Khalil, East Azerbaijan Province. The station is owned by IRI Railway. It serves the locality of Dizaj Khalil and other communities nearby from county capital Shabestar and Vayqan, and also Islamic Azad University of Shabestar, 3.5 km away next to Sufian-Salmas Highway.

References

External links

Railway stations in Iran